A glee club is a choir that specializes in singing short songs.

Glee Club or The Glee Club may also refer to:

 Glee Club (British politics), an event at the Liberal Democrats conference
 Glee Club (TV series), British talent show
 The Glee Club, a chain of British performance venues
 The Glee Club (band), an Irish band
 The Glee Club, a 2002 play by Richard Cameron

See also
 Glee (music)
 Glee (TV series), an American musical comedy-drama (2009-2015)
 List of collegiate glee clubs